The Caleb Pusey House, built in 1683 in Upland, Pennsylvania, is the second oldest English house in Pennsylvania open to the public (Wall House in Cheltenham Township is the oldest).  Built in a vernacular English yeoman's style, it is the only remaining house where William Penn is known to have visited. It stood on  near Chester Creek which Penn granted Pusey, a plantation which the latter named "Landing Ford".  Since the 1950s, the building and grounds (now 9 acres) have been owned by the Friends of the Caleb Pusey House, Inc.  The house was restored and the property is operated as a historic house museum.

It was listed on the National Register of Historic Places in 1971.

Caleb Pusey
Caleb Pusey, formally Caleb Bartholomew alias Pusey, (c. 1650–1727) was a Quaker lastmaker (a maker of wooden foot molds for cobblers) and a friend and business partner of William Penn, the founder of the colony of Pennsylvania. Pusey came to the colony from England in 1682, having been born in the parish of Lambourn, to manage Chester Mills for Penn. Situated on Chester Creek west of Philadelphia, they were the first Proprietary grist mill and sawmill in the colony. From 1701, Pusey served as a justice of the provincial supreme court. Pusey became involved with the local Quaker community, as well as local government. He wrote a number of pamphlets, several in defense of William Penn.

The Caleb Pusey house, at 15 Race Street, Upland, Pennsylvania, is likely the oldest house in the state. Caleb Pusey, a Quaker, came to Pennsylvania from England in 1682 with his wife Anne Worley and her two sons, Francis and Henry, from her first marriage. He and Penn had arranged to ship a prefabricated mill on The Welcome, in order to erect it in the colony. By the first winter in Pennsylvania they had only completed a pit-house as a residence, and lived in severe conditions. Anne had a miscarriage that winter.

Pusey began their one-story house in 1683. It was constructed in two stages, probably finished a couple of years apart. A storage attic is above the main level. By 1696 Pusey and his family occupied the completed house and hosted the Quaker services of the Chester Monthly Meeting. It is built from native stone in the vernacular tradition of yeomen's houses of Berkshire, England, Pusey's home county. Bricks have been interspersed randomly through the construction, probably replacing missing stones.

In 1717, the Pusey family moved to East Marlborough Township, where he was involved in politics. The Landingford property was later owned by a succession of people, including industrialist John Price Crozer. The house was privately owned and occupied until about 1950. Also on the property are the Pennock Log House, built by a descendant of Pusey's in 1790; and the Crozer School, built by Crozer for the children of millworkers at his factory. Some of the many thousands of artifacts found during twentieth-century excavations on the property are on display in the Crozer School. Crozer also built the Upland Baptist Church and millworker housing in the area.

Weather vane
In the late 1840s, a resident discovered an iron weather vane, believed to be from Pusey's mill.  Initials on the weather vane are those of the partners William Penn, Samuel Carpenter, and Caleb Pusey. The weather vane was donated to the Philadelphia Historical Society, then gilded and displayed on a roof in Harrisburg.  It is now occasionally displayed at the Atwater Kent Museum of Philadelphia.  The Friends of the Caleb Pusey House are trying to arrange for the weather vane to be returned or loaned to the house museum.

See also
South Brook Farm
List of the oldest buildings in Pennsylvania

References

External links
Google Street View Caleb Pusey House
Caleb Pusey House and Landingford Plantation, History of Delaware County
"Caleb Pusey House & Landingford Plantation", The Friends of the Caleb Pusey House, Inc.
Caleb Pusey House at the Historic American Buildings Survey (HABS) (Library of Congress)

Houses on the National Register of Historic Places in Pennsylvania
Historic American Buildings Survey in Pennsylvania
Houses completed in 1683
Museums in Delaware County, Pennsylvania
Historic house museums in Pennsylvania
Houses in Delaware County, Pennsylvania
National Register of Historic Places in Delaware County, Pennsylvania
1683 establishments in Pennsylvania